"Open Wide" is a song by Scottish DJ and producer Calvin Harris from his fourth studio album, Motion (2014). It features American rapper Big Sean. Originally released a promotional single on 27 October 2014, the song officially impacted rhythmic contemporary radio in the United States on 27 January 2015 as the album's fifth single. "Open Wide" is the vocal version of Harris's instrumental track "C.U.B.A", which appears as a B-side to his single "Blame". It peaked at number 23 in the UK, becoming Harris's first single to miss the top 10 since 2010.

Music video
The video was directed by Emil Nava, and is a cinematic clip featuring a desert shoot-out. As two opposing sides blast shot after shot at each other, a ballerina dances in the middle of the gunfight, dodging bullets with the dexterity of Keanu Reeves in The Matrix.

Personnel
Credits adapted from the liner notes of Motion.

 Calvin Harris – vocals, all instruments, arrangement, production
 Big Sean – vocals
 Chris Galland – mixing assistance
 Manny Marroquin – mixing
 Ike Schultz – mixing assistance

Charts

Weekly charts

Year-end charts

Release history

References

2014 songs
2015 singles
Big Sean songs
Calvin Harris songs
Columbia Records singles
Songs written by Big Sean
Songs written by Calvin Harris